Bence Jagodics (born 31 March 1994) is a Hungarian professional footballer who plays for Ajka.

Club career
On 23 June 2022, Jagodics signed a three-year contract with Ajka.

Club statistics

Updated to games played as of 19 May 2019.

References

External links

MLSZ 

1994 births
Living people
Sportspeople from Szombathely
Hungarian footballers
Hungary youth international footballers
Hungary under-21 international footballers
Association football defenders
Szombathelyi Haladás footballers
Lombard-Pápa TFC footballers
Nyíregyháza Spartacus FC players
FC Ajka players
Szeged-Csanád Grosics Akadémia footballers
Balmazújvárosi FC players
BFC Siófok players
Nemzeti Bajnokság I players
Nemzeti Bajnokság II players